250 Vesey Street, formerly Four World Financial Center, is one of four towers that comprise the Brookfield Place complex in the Financial District of Lower Manhattan in New York City. The building opened in 1986 as part of the World Financial Center and was designed by Cesar Pelli & Associates.

After the September 11 attacks, the building sustained major damage to its roof; however, the general damage to the building was less than that to the other three towers. On October 23, 2001, about two dozen senior executives of Merrill Lynch began returning to their offices on a limited number of floors within the building, making it the first tower in the four-tower complex to be reoccupied after the attacks.

The structure was renamed 250 Vesey Street when the complex became Brookfield Place in 2014.

Four World Financial Center houses the financial offices of Merrill Lynch and Jane Street Capital. Other tenants include the headquarters of the College Board.

See also
World Trade Center
Brookfield Place (New York City)

References

External links

in-Arch.net: The World Financial Center
Emporis – Building ID #115597

1986 establishments in New York City
Office buildings completed in 1986
Skyscraper office buildings in Manhattan
Merrill (company)
Brookfield Place (New York City)
Brookfield Properties buildings
Battery Park City